North-Eastern Metropolitan Region, previously Eastern Metropolitan Region between 2006 and 2022, is one of the eight electoral regions of Victoria, Australia, which elects five members to the Victorian Legislative Council (also referred to as the upper house) by proportional representation. The region was created in 2006 following the 2005 reform of the Victorian Legislative Council. The region was renamed to its current name since the 2022 state election.

The region extends from Melbourne's inner eastern suburbs of Bulleen and Doncaster, north across the Yarra River to Lower Plenty and Eltham, and across to Bayswater, Croydon and Ferntree Gully (in the Dandenong Ranges) in the east below the Dandenong Ranges. It comprises the Legislative Assembly districts of Bayswater, Box Hill, Bulleen, Bundoora, Croydon, Eltham, Glen Waverley, Ivanhoe, Mill Park, Ringwood and Warrandyte.

Members

Returned MLCs by seat
Seats are allocated by single transferable vote using group voting tickets. Changes in party membership between elections have been omitted for simplicity.

Election results

References

External links
North-Eastern Metropolitan Region, Victorian Electoral Commission

Electoral regions of Victoria (Australia)
Electoral districts and divisions of Greater Melbourne